Barbour's rock mouse (Petromyscus barbouri) is a species of rodent in the family Nesomyidae.
It is found only in South Africa.
Its natural habitats are subtropical or tropical dry shrubland and rocky areas.
It is threatened by habitat loss.

References

Sources

Endemic fauna of South Africa
Petromyscus
Mammals of South Africa
Mammals described in 1938
Taxonomy articles created by Polbot